The "Casa del Moral" (House of the mulberry tree) is a large ancestral house built around 1730 in Arequipa, Peru. Favored by tourists, it is one of the best and well-preserved samples of Andean Baroque civil architecture in Peru. The name of the house derives from the emblematic presence of a centennial tree of "moras" (Mulberry) in the center of the main patio of the large house.

The Casa del Moral houses a collection of paintings from the "Escuela Cusqueña" (Cusco School), a colonial  art form. Its library contains more than 3,000 volumes, primarily hispanic literature. The house is currently the property of the Peruvian bank Bancosur.

See also
 Santa Catalina Monastery
 Goyeneche Palace, Arequipa
 Arequipa, ciudad de luz y terremoto
 Sachaca, pueblo tradicional de Arequipa
 “Casa del Moral” - in Spanish
 AQPlink - in Spanish

Roman Catholic churches completed in 1630
Buildings and structures in Arequipa
1630 establishments in the Spanish Empire
Houses in Peru
Andean Baroque architecture in Peru
17th-century Roman Catholic church buildings in Peru